Favour Ashe (born 28 April 2002) is a Nigerian track and field athlete who competes in the short sprints.

Ashe attended Otovwodo Grammar School in Ughelli, Nigeria before enrolling as a student at the University of Tennessee. Having only arrived in America in January 2022, Ashe came third in the men's 60-meter dash at the 2022 NCAA Division I Indoor Track and Field Championships, and was runner up in the 100 metres at the 2022 NCAA Division I Outdoor Track and Field Championships. He also came fourth in the 4 x 100m relay running with Wayne Pinnock, Carey McLeod and Emmanuel Bynum. In 2022 Ashe ran the fastest time in history by any Nigerian athlete in all conditions, running a wind assisted  9.79s (+3.0) 100m heat at the LSU invitational meet in Baton Rouge. Following the 2022 collegiate season, he transferred to Auburn University to continue his studies and athletic career.

Ashe ran a legal 100m personal best of 9.99s to win gold at the Nigerian national championships in 2022. At the 2022 World Athletics Championships in Eugene, Oregon, Ashe qualified through to the semi finals running 10.00s in his heat. He went on to end his season with a bronze medal in the 4 x 100m relay at the 2022 Commonwealth Games in Birmingham, England.

References

2002 births
Living people
Nigerian male sprinters
World Athletics Championships athletes for Nigeria
21st-century Nigerian people
Athletes (track and field) at the 2022 Commonwealth Games
Commonwealth Games bronze medallists for Nigeria
Commonwealth Games medallists in athletics
Medallists at the 2022 Commonwealth Games